Charles Peckham Day (born February 9, 1976) is an American actor, writer, producer and podcaster. He is best known for playing Charlie Kelly on the FX comedy It's Always Sunny in Philadelphia (2005–present), which he co-created with Rob McElhenney and Glenn Howerton, and on which he is also executive producer and writer. In 2011, he was nominated for a Critics' Choice Television Award and a Satellite Award for the role. He subsequently co-created The Cool Kids (2018–2019) on Fox with Paul Fruchbom in 2018 and Mythic Quest (2020–present) on Apple TV+ with Rob McElhenney and Megan Ganz in 2020, and continues to executive-produce the latter. 

On film, he is best known for his performances as biologist Dr Newton Geiszler in Guillermo del Toro's science-fiction monster movie Pacific Rim (2013) and its sequel Pacific Rim: Uprising (2018), Dale Arbus in the comedy Horrible Bosses (2011) and sequel Horrible Bosses 2 (2014), and teacher Andy Campbell in the comedy Fist Fight (2017). He is also known for his voice roles in Monsters University (2013) and The Lego Movie film franchise (2014–2019). He will voice Luigi in the upcoming Nintendo film The Super Mario Bros. Movie in April 2023, and also make his directorial debut with Fool's Paradise slated for release in May 2023.

Early life
Day was born in New York City. His family lived in the Riverdale section of the Bronx. He spent most of his childhood in Middletown, Rhode Island. He is the youngest of two children, with an elder sister named Alice. His father, Dr. Thomas Charles Day, who is of Italian and Irish descent, is a retired professor of music history at Salve Regina University in Newport, Rhode Island; and his mother, Mary (née Peckham), was a piano teacher at The Pennfield School in Portsmouth, Rhode Island. She was of English descent. His paternal grandfather changed the family name from Del Giorno to Day to assimilate during WWII; he died in a military training accident when his son Thomas was only four.

Day attended Pennfield School and graduated from the Portsmouth Abbey School, both in Portsmouth, Rhode Island. He majored in art history at Merrimack College in North Andover, Massachusetts in 1998, where he was active in the Onstagers, Merrimack's student theater organization. In May 2014, he gave the commencement speech for Merrimack's graduating class and received an honorary Ph.D.

Career

While still in college, Day was active in the training programs at the Williamstown Theatre Festival every summer from 1997, where he was a contemporary of actors such as Jimmi Simpson, David Hornsby, Kathryn Hahn, Justin Long and Sterling K. Brown. Day went on to play the lead role in Dead End, at the Huntington Theatre in Boston. 

After graduating, Day worked on small television roles, advertisements, and voiceovers for the Independent Film Channel, and supplemented his income by waiting tables and answering phones for a telethon. In the early 2000s, he had guest and recurring appearances on television shows such as Law & Order, Third Watch, Reno 911!  and the short-lived sitcom Luis.

It's Always Sunny in Philadelphia and related projects 
In the early years of his career, Day often made comedy sketches and absurd short films in his spare time with Jimmi Simpson, whom he was living with in New York City, and several friends including David Hornsby, Nate Mooney, Logan Marshall-Green and other actors, many of whom they had met through the Williamstown Theatre Festival. These home videos served as the inspiration for several scripted short films he later developed with Rob McElhenney and Glenn Howerton in 2003, once he had moved out to LA. Among these home movies were two scenes about three struggling self-involved actors in LA getting into awkward and darkly comedic situations between auditions and jobs, which went on to form the basis of the pilot episode of the comedy series that would go on to be known as It's Always Sunny in Philadelphia. 

In 2005, the first season of It's Always Sunny in Philadelphia was released on FX television. In addition to being a co-creator, executive producer and prolific writer on the show, Day plays Charlie Kelly, one of the main characters on the show. His performance received widespread recognition and has been the source of several memes through the years, most notably the Pepe Silvia conspiracy meme. In 2021, IASIP became the longest running live action comedy on American television with the release of its fifteenth season. The series is still ongoing with its sixteenth season set to release in 2023.

Since November 2021, Day, McElhenney and Howerton have been releasing The Always Sunny Podcast. They set out to rewatch the entire series and share behind-the-scenes information, but the podcast's focus shifted to the banter and dynamic between the three creators.

Day has also co-created and produced several television shows in addition to It's Always Sunny in Philadelphia. In 2011 and 2012, he produced the short-lived comedies How to Be a Gentleman (2011–2012) and Unsupervised (2012), which were created by Sunny writers David Hornsby, Scott Marder and Rob Rosell. In 2017, he co-created the Fox sitcom The Cool Kids (2018–2019), starring Vicki Lawrence, Martin Mull, David Alan Grier and Leslie Jordan and set in a retirement community. He served as an executive producer through its first season after which the show was cancelled. 

On August 9, 2019, Mythic Quest (2020–present), a new half-hour comedy series co-created by Day, McElhenney and Megan Ganz, who is also an executive producer on Sunny, was announced as one of the original productions for the then-upcoming streaming service, Apple TV+. In addition to being co-creator, Day is an executive producer on Mythic Quest, which has been renewed for a fourth season.

Films and other work 

In July 2011, Day starred in New Line Cinema's Horrible Bosses with Jason Bateman, Jason Sudeikis, Kevin Spacey, Jennifer Aniston, Colin Farrell, and Jamie Foxx. The film was a commercial success and Day's performance as Dale Arbus was praised by critics. He later reprised the role in the sequel Horrible Bosses 2 released in November 2014. Day had previously worked with Sudeikis in the 2010 film Going the Distance, starring Justin Long and Drew Barrymore. 

Day hosted the November 5, 2011, episode of Saturday Night Live (SNL) with Maroon 5 as the musical guest. He was the second cast member from It's Always Sunny in Philadelphia to host SNL (after Danny DeVito, though DeVito hosted SNL before IASIP premiered, the last time being in 1999; notably, however, DeVito would make a brief cameo during Day's opening monologue in this episode). Day would also make another brief cameo in the following season's episode hosted by Jamie Foxx on December 8, 2012, as a congressman in the episode's sketch "Maine Justice". In September 2014, Day provided his voice for The Sims 4 TV spots.

Day had a significant role in the Guillermo del Toro science fiction kaiju film Pacific Rim (2013), in which he played biologist Dr Newton "Newt" Geiszler, who is the focus of the secondary comedic plot with Burn Gorman and Ron Perlman. He was cast based on his performance in the IASIP episode Charlie Kelly: King of the Rats as del Toro was a fan of the show. In exchange, Day created the recurring role of Pappy McPoyle for del Toro on IASIP. In 2018, he reprised the role of Newt for the sequel Pacific Rim Uprising directed by Steven S. DeKnight.

In 2015, Day and Ice Cube were cast as the leads in Fist Fight, a story about two teachers brawling conceived by Max Greenfield. Day plays Andy Campbell, a high school English teacher, who is challenged by his co-worker, history teacher Ronald Strickland (Ice Cube), to a fight after getting him fired. The film was directed by Richie Keen, who had directed episodes of It's Always Sunny in Philadelphia, and released in February 2017. 

Later that year, Day played Ralph, a vulgar comedian and close friend of the protagonist, in I Love You, Daddy, which was directed by Louis C.K. and featured himself, Chloe Grace Moretz, John Malkovich, Rose Byrne, Pamela Adlon, Edie Falco and Helen Hunt. Day was the first to have been cast as C.K. was a fan of It's Always Sunny in Philadelphia. The film premiered at TIFF 2017 and was scheduled to have its public opening in November 2017, but was dropped by all its distributors after the allegations of C.K.'s sexual misconduct were made public by the New York Times. Day had withdrawn himself from the film's promotion and condemned the misconduct in light of the allegations before the film's public release was cancelled.

In addition to Pacific Rim Uprising, in 2018, Day was in Drew Pearce's film Hotel Artemis, with Jodie Foster, Sterling K Brown, Sofia Boutella, Jeff Goldblum, Brian Tyree Henry, Jenny Slate, Zachary Quinto and Dave Bautista, where he played Acapulco the arms dealer. Most recently, Day played his first leading role in a romantic comedy as Peter on I Want You Back with Jenny Slate for Amazon Studios released on February 11, 2022.

Day got his first film voice acting role in 2013 as the character Art in the Pixar animated film Monsters University. Following this, he voiced Benny in The Lego Movie (2014) and its sequel The Lego Movie 2: The Second Part (2019). In September 2021, Nintendo announced that Day would voice Luigi, in The Super Mario Bros. Movie, set to be released on April 7, 2023. 

In 2018, Day began working on his feature directorial debut Fool's Paradise (previously titled El Tonto), starring Ken Jeong and himself, and featuring Ray Liotta, Kate Beckinsale, Adrien Brody, Common, Jason Sudeikis, Edie Falco and John Malkovich. Besides writing and producing, Day co-stars as a silent man from a psychiatric hospital who accidentally finds his way into celebrity with the help of an enterprising publicist (Jeong) before they lose it all. The film underwent several reshoots and is due to be released on 12 May 2023.

Personal life
A skilled musician, Day can play the piano, accordion, trombone, guitar, and harmonica, and has written or improvised most of the songs featured on It's Always Sunny in Philadelphia. In 2014, he received an honorary doctorate in performing arts from Merrimack College, where he also delivered that year's keynote address.

In 2001, Day met actress Mary Elizabeth Ellis. They were already dating in 2004 when they co-starred as incestuous siblings on Reno 911!. Ellis has a recurring role on It's Always Sunny in Philadelphia as The Waitress, the object of the unrequited love and obsession for Day's character. The couple married on March 4, 2006. They had their first child, a son named Russell Wallace Day, in December 2011. They live in Los Angeles, California.

Day has stated with uncertainty that he is agnostic.

Filmography

Film

Television

Video games

Web

Music videos

Theme park attractions

Theatre

Awards and nominations

References

External links

 

1976 births
Living people
20th-century American comedians
21st-century American comedians
21st-century American male actors
21st-century American male writers
21st-century American screenwriters
American agnostics
American male film actors
American male comedians
American male television actors
American male television writers
American male video game actors
American male voice actors
American people of English descent
American people of Irish descent
American people of Welsh descent
American television writers
American writers of Italian descent
Male actors from Rhode Island
Male actors from New York City
Merrimack College alumni
People from Middletown, Rhode Island
Portsmouth Abbey School alumni
Screenwriters from New York (state)
Screenwriters from Rhode Island